David Todd Wilkinson (May 13, 1935 – September 5, 2002) was an American cosmologist, specializing in the study of the cosmic microwave background radiation (CMB).

Education 
Wilkinson was born in Hillsdale, Michigan on May 13, 1935, and earned his Ph.D. in physics at the University of Michigan under the supervision of H. Richard Crane.

Research and career 
Wilkinson was a Professor of Physics at Princeton University from 1965 until his retirement in 2002. He made fundamental contributions to many major cosmic microwave background experiments, including two NASA satellites: the Cosmic Background Explorer (COBE) and the Wilkinson Microwave Anisotropy Probe (WMAP), the latter of which was named in his honor after his death due to cancer on September 5, 2002.

Accolades 
 Princeton President's Award for Distinguished Teaching
 Election to the National Academy of Sciences (1983)
 James Craig Watson Medal (2001)

References

External links

 John Mather and P. James E. Peebles, "David Todd Wilkinson", Biographical Memoirs of the National Academy of Sciences (2009)

1935 births
2002 deaths
20th-century American astronomers
American cosmologists
Princeton University faculty
Deaths from cancer in New Jersey
Members of the United States National Academy of Sciences
People from Hillsdale, Michigan
University of Michigan alumni